The 2017–18 Rhode Island Rams women's basketball team will represent the University of Rhode Island during the 2017–18 NCAA Division I women's basketball season. The Rams are led by fourth year head coach Daynia La-Force. The Rams were members of the Atlantic 10 Conference and play their home games at the Ryan Center. They finished the season 3–27, 1–15 in A-10 to finish in last place. They lost in the first round of the A-10 women's tournament to Fordham.

2017–18 media
All Rams home games and most conference road games that aren't televised will be shown on the A-10 Digital Network.

Roster

Schedule

|-
!colspan=9 style="background:#75B2DD; color:#002b7f;"| Exhibition

|-
!colspan=9 style="background:#75B2DD; color:#002b7f;"| Non-conference regular season

|-
!colspan=9 style="background:#75B2DD; color:#002b7f;"| Atlantic 10 regular season

|-
!colspan=9 style="background:#75B2DD; color:#002B7F;"| Atlantic 10 Women's Tournament

See also
 2017–18 Rhode Island Rams men's basketball team

References

Rhode Island Rams women's basketball seasons
Rhode Island
Rhode
Rhode